Sainte-Camelle is a municipality in the Aude department, Occitanie region, in the southern part of France at 45 km from Carcassonne, the department capital. Sainte-Camelle is 623 km from Paris.

Population

See also
Communes of the Aude department

References
Sainte-Camelle on ING

Communes of Aude
Aude communes articles needing translation from French Wikipedia